Samuel Page (born Samuel L. Elliott; November 5, 1976) is an American actor. He has appeared on popular television shows, such as All My Children, Mad Men, Desperate Housewives, House of Cards, Switched at Birth, Scandal, Unbreakable Kimmy Schmidt, Gossip Girl, and The Bold Type.

Early life
Page was born in Whitefish Bay, Wisconsin. He captained the football and baseball teams at Whitefish Bay High School. He attended Princeton University, where he earned a BA in ecology and evolutionary biology in 1998.

Career

After completing his degree, Page decided to become an actor despite having no high school acting experience. "I came home and told my mom and dad I was moving to Hollywood to become an actor." While in Los Angeles, Page appeared on the television shows Desperate Housewives, Popular, 7th Heaven, Undressed, and Men, Women & Dogs. In New York City, he was cast in 2002 as Trey Kenyon on the daytime soap opera All My Children.

Page had a recurring role in American Dreams and guest-starred in other series, such as CSI: Miami and Wicked Science. In 2005, he was cast as Jesse Parker on Fox's supernatural drama Point Pleasant. In 2006, he had a starring role on the CBS drama series Shark. He played Joan Holloway's fiancé and then husband, Greg Harris, on Mad Men, and in 2010 he appeared in a multi-episode arc on ABC's Desperate Housewives as Sam, son of Rex Van de Kamp (Steven Culp) and stepson of Bree Hodge (Marcia Cross).

In 2008, Page appeared in will.i.am's video "Yes We Can" in support of Barack Obama's presidential bid, along with numerous other celebrities. In addition to television, Page's film credits include The Brotherhood, Prison of the Dead, and Micro Mini-Kids. Page was featured as one of People magazine's most eligible bachelors in June 2002.

In 2010, Page guest-starred in the fourth season of The CW's Gossip Girl as Colin Forrester, a young college professor and Serena van der Woodsen's (Blake Lively) new love interest. Colin was also Juliet Sharp (Katie Cassidy) and Ben Donovan (David Call)'s cousin. Page appeared on the cover of the February 2011 issue of J.Crew's clothing catalogue and magazine. In 2012, Page had a starring role in the Lifetime film In the Dark as Jeff, an aide hired to assist a beautiful young artist recently blinded in a car crash that killed her husband and child. However, he soon begins to stalk and terrorize her.

In 2013, Page joined the cast of the Netflix drama series House of Cards for their second season. In 2017, he played the lead role in the Hallmark Channel film Royal New Year's Eve as Prince Jeffery. In February, 2019, he starred in another romantic Hallmark Movie, 'The Story of Us', playing Sawyer O'Dell, a property builder planning a development that threatens a bookstore owned by his former high school sweetheart.

In 2017, Page joined the cast of The Bold Type as Richard Hunter, on the Scarlet Board of Directors, and Sutton's love interest.

Personal life 
In 2014, Page married Cassidy Boesch at a villa just outside Santa Barbara, California. Among Page's groomsmen was Mean Girls star and Dancing with the Stars contestant Jonathan Bennett.
On September 27, 2016, Sam announced the birth of their son, Logan, and on August 11, 2018, their twin girls were born (Annabelle and Evie).

Filmography

Film

Television

References

External links
 

1976 births
20th-century American male actors
21st-century American male actors
American male film actors
American male television actors
Living people
Male actors from Wisconsin
People from Whitefish Bay, Wisconsin
Princeton Tigers football players
Princeton University alumni
Whitefish Bay High School alumni